Lhuentse Dzong is a dzong and Buddhist monastery in Lhuentse District in eastern Bhutan. It lies on the eastern side of the Kuri Chhu and is perched on a spur at the end of a narrow valley.

The Dzong was initially known as Kurtoe in the then-isolated Lhuentse District. It is the ancestral home of the House of Wangchuck (Dasho Jigme Namgyal was born there in 1825).

While its geographic coordinates are in eastern Bhutan, its cultural roots are central Bhutanese. This was because before road traffic connected it to Mongar, the approach was through a trade route crossing Rodang Pass.

Topography

The Dzong is located in the Kuri Chhu valley, which is part of the Lhuntse district. The Kuri Chhu is the major river that has formed the scenic valley with high peaks and steep hills. Kuri Chhu is a tributary of the Manas River system, which is the largest river of Bhutan and a major tributary of the Brahmaputra River that drains most of Eastern Bhutan.

The approach to this Dzong is over a flag-stone-paved path over the steep cliffs.

History
According to one legend, Khedrup Kuenga Wangpo, son of Tertön Pema Lingpa was assigned to find a ridge resembling the trunk of an elephant. He found one opposite Baeyul Khenpajong and mediated there. This location came to be known as Kurtoe Lhuentse Phodrang. 

The monastery was originally established by Pema Lingpa's son Kuenga Wanpo in 1543, although it wasn't until 1654 that the Trongsa penlop (governor), Minjur Tenpa, built a formal dzong here after winning a battle and named it Lhuentse Rinchentse. The dzong was later restored in 1962 and again between 1972 and 1974. The historic importance of Lhuntse Dzongkhag is on account of its established link as the ancestral home of the Wangchuck Dynasty. Lhuentse town is the administrative capital of Lhuentse District, besides the Lhuentse Dzong. At present 100 monks reside here.

Architecture

The dzong contains five temples, three of which are in the central tower and are dedicated to Padmasambhava. The dzong also contains a Gonkhang, which is dedicated to Mahākāla, and a temple dedicated to Amitāyus, the Buddha of Infinite Life. The ground floor also has a temple dedicated to Avalokiteśvara. The Kunre, the assembly hall for the monks, is located on the upper floor.

2009 earthquake damage
The dzong has suffered serious damage during an earthquake measuring 6.1 on the Richter magnitude scale that hit eastern Bhutan on Monday, 21 September 2009. Many other monasteries in the region also suffered serious damage.

Other attractions
Khoma village, which is an hour walk from the main road to Lhuntse Dzong is famous for its intricate woven cloth made of silk called Kishu Thara. Other well known pilgrimage sites of Padmasambhava are Singye Dzong, the beyul Khenpajong and Phunying Pass. Singye Dzong was founded by Yeshe Tsogyal and visited by Padmasambhava on his second visit to Bhutan, which is a three-day trek from Khoma.

Weaving
The weaving handicraft looms loom large in households here and the handlooms produced are very famous. This household industry is dominated by women folks who weave different types of textiles with intricate designs. The unique weaving activities involve embroidery, basket-making and kushutara (brocade dress). Textiles products of Lhuntse are stated to be the best in the country.

References

External links
coordinates of Lhunshi now known as Lhuentse

Dzongs in Bhutan
Buddhist monasteries in Bhutan
Nyingma monasteries and temples
1543 establishments in Asia
Religious buildings and structures completed in 1654
Tibetan Buddhism in Bhutan